The Hook Alliance Treaty was signed during the first phase of the Hook and Cod wars in the County of Holland. By this treaty the Hook faction promised to support Margaret II, Countess of Hainaut against her rebellious son William of Bavaria.

Context

Origins of the Hook faction 
The roots of the Hook Faction can be traced back to the reign of Count William III of Holland, who successfully ruled Holland, Zeeland and Hainaut from 1304 to 1337. During his reign the courtier and financer Willem van Duvenvoorde (c. 1290-1353) managed the internal affairs of Holland. This enabled Van Duvenvoorde and his relatives, the families: Wasseaar, Polanen, Brederode, Boechorst, etc. to amass fiefs and great fortunes.

During the short reign of Count William IV (1337-1345) the Duvenvoorde clan continued in favor, while the financial situation got out of hand due to the lifestyle of the count.

Chaos after the death of William IV 
When Count William IV got killed during his failed expedition to Friesland in late September 1345, the nobility had long been divided in two parties: pro and contra Van Duvenvoorde, and was arduous to fight. The Duvenvoorde clan would later become known as the 'Hook' faction, their enemies became known as the 'Cod' faction. Most of the cities of Holland inclined to the Cod faction.

In early 1346 Margaret II, Countess of Hainaut became count of Holland, Zeeland and Hainault. She restored order, and made her second son William of Bavaria her lieutenant in Holland. He was assisted by a council that was again dominated by Van Duvenvoorde, and so nothing was done to quiet the nobility and rebellious cities. Soon, insubordination and anarchy took over in Holland and Zeeland.

Signing the Hook Alliance Treaty 
Before 5 September 1350 the Hook faction signed the treaty later known as the Hook Alliance Treaty. On 21 September 1350 Margaret and William of Bavaria then came to Geertruidenberg, where she deposed him of all authority in Holland.

William of Bavaria was then sent to Hainault, and practically imprisoned there. The Hooks seemed victorious, but by February 1351, the Cods had freed Count William, who became their leader. The Cod faction also made formal alliances. The most well known is the Cod Alliance Treaty

Treaty

Content 
The Hook Alliance Treaty is a rather straightforward document. It is a list of signatories followed by mutual promises, and sealed in Hainaut.

List of signatories 
The list of signatories shows the extent of partisanship at the time, and can be compared to the list of enemies in the Cod Alliance Treaty. 

The Hook alliance treaty uses the word  in the usual way. If the word  (Sir) is placed before the name, it denoted that someone was a knight. Squires (except Van Wasseaar) did not get the honorific 'sir'. The word  after the name indicates that someone ruled a territory, and is therefore translated as 'lord'. In case that somebody is a knight, and rules territory, the second  / Lord is omitted. E.g. Sir Gerard van Heemstede. However, sometimes this was not possible, because the family names differed. E.g. Sir Philips van Polanen held the Lordship Polanen with Polanen Castle. Sir Jan van Polanen had the Lordship of the Lek as his most prestigious possession.

The Hook alliance treaty
Knights:
Sir Willem van Duvenvoorde Lord of Oosterhout
Sir Jan van Polanen Lord of De Lek
Sir Dirk van Brederode
Sir Arnoud van Duvenvoorde
Sir Jacob van de Binckhorst
Sir Filips van Polanen
Sir Gerard van Heemstede
Sir Daniel van Matenesse
Sir Willem van Oudshoorn
Sir Gerard van Poelgeest
Sir Jacob van der Woude
Sir Jan van Egmond
Sir Floris van de Boekhorst
Sir Herper van de Binckhorst
Sir Dirk van Raaphorst
Sir Jan van de Boekhorst
Sir Arend van Hodenpijl
Sir Dirk Uten Waarde
Sir Troveis van Rijneveld
-
-
Priest:
-
Squires:
Sir Dirk III van Wassenaer Burgrave of Leiden
Dirk van Polanen
Jan van Noordwijk
Daniel van Rodenrijs
Jan van Mijnden
Jan van den Zijl
Jan van der Made
Ogier van Kralingen
Dirk van Spangen
Mouwerijn van der Does
Willem van Zanen

The list of Hooks in the Cod treaty
Knights:
Sir Willem van Duvenvoorde
Sir Jan van Polanen
Sir Dirk van Brederode (also erroneously named Willem)  
Sir Arent van Duvenvoorde
Sir Jacob van de Binckhorst
In: 'The brothers of John of Polanen'
Sir Gerard van Heemstede
-
Sir Willem van Oudshoorn
Sir Gerard of Poelgeest
-
-
Sir Floris van de Boukhorst
Sir Herper van de Binckhorst
Sir Dirk of Raaphorst
-
-
-
-
Sir Harper van Rieden
Sir Jan van Meerensteyne Aelbertsz

Priest:
Heer Mathijs van der Burgh
Squires:
-
-
Jan van Noordwijk
-
-
-
Jan van der Made
-
-
-
-
Reinier Dever son of Lord Gerrit
Gerrit Dever Jansz.
Floris van Raaphorst
Christiaan and Wouter van Raaphorst
The other Raaphorst brothers sons of Gerrit
Arend van Groeneveld
Dirk van Groeneveld
Jan van den Burch
Jan Symonsz. van der Burch

The content of the treaty 
The content of the treaty consisted of two parts. The first part consisted of promises by the Hook nobles and Margaret to help each other. I.e. they allied against an unnamed enemy. The second part consisted of Margaret authorizing the Hooks to use force against this unnamed enemy.

The promise of the Hook lords was a statement that they would always support 'their legal lord empress Margaret of Hainaut and Holland'.

In Le Quesnoy (Hainaut) Margaret added that she would protect these nobles on 5 September 1350. She stated that the signatories had fought against people living in her lands and outside. These people had attempted to evict her party from her lands, and burned and looted in her lands. She then took responsibility for what these nobles had done so far, or would do against this enemy. (Our enemies have done or will do with burning...)

Notes

References
 
 
 

Hook and Cod wars